Scoce is a surname. Notable people with the surname include:

Roger Scoce, MP for Dartmouth
William Scoce, MP for Lostwithiel (UK Parliament constituency)